Baradene College of the Sacred Heart is a Catholic high school for girls aged from 11 to 18 (Year 7–13) located in Remuera, Auckland, New Zealand. It is based on the philosophy of Madeleine Sophie Barat, who founded the Society of the Sacred Heart.

Established 1909, Baradene celebrated its 100th year in 2009.

The students participate in school events such as House Parades, swimming sports, athletics day and house singing, gaining points for their houses.

They also have, at the end of each year, a school mass farewelling the seniors of the school, opening mass (celebrating the new school year) and individual year level liturgies.

Every year a different school goal is chosen as the focus of the year from the list of 5:
 Social awareness which impels to action
 Faith which is relevant in today's world
 A deep respect for intellectual values
 The building of community as a Christian value
 Personal growth in an atmosphere of wise freedom

Three school buildings, Mitchelson House, the original building, and the former stables, are listed as Category II Historic Places.

Houses

Baradene College has six houses:
 Amiens (Red)
 Barat (White)
 Erskine (Yellow)
 Loreto (Green)
 Philippine (Purple)
 Stuart (Blue)

Students attend a House Mass in the school chapel once a year. The houses also compete to gain points in events such as House Parades, sports events and House Singing. Academic awards also reward points. At the end of the school year the house with the most points will be rewarded with the House Cup.

See also
 List of schools in New Zealand
 Network of Sacred Heart Schools

Notes

External links
 
 Society of the Sacred Heart

Heritage New Zealand Category 2 historic places in the Auckland Region
Educational institutions established in 1909
Girls' schools in New Zealand
Catholic secondary schools in Auckland
1909 establishments in New Zealand
Sacred Heart schools
1910s architecture in New Zealand